Edwin Ernest Barnett (July–September 1870 – date of death unknown) was an English cricketer. Barnett's batting and bowling styles are unknown. He was born in Leominster, Herefordshire.

Barnett made his only first-class appearance for the Marylebone Cricket Club in 1908 against Leicestershire at Lord's. In this match he scored a single run in the MCC first-innings, before being dismissed by John King. In their second-innings he scored 70 runs before being dismissed by Ewart Astill. Barnett played a single Minor Counties Championship match for Buckinghamshire against Berkshire in 1913.

Below first-class level Barnett played, in a single county match, for Shropshire in 1899, scoring a century with 136 runs, and for Hertfordshire, and at club level for Hampstead and Richmond.

His date of death is unknown.

References

External links
Edwin Barnett at ESPNcricinfo
Edwin Barnett at CricketArchive

1870 births
People from Leominster
Sportspeople from Herefordshire
English cricketers
Marylebone Cricket Club cricketers
Buckinghamshire cricketers
Year of death missing